The Million Dollar Collar is a 1929 American part-talkie crime film directed by D. Ross Lederman. It was a part-talkie released in Vitaphone with music and sound effects. The film is in unknown status which suggests that it may be lost. According to Warner Bros records the film earned $222,000 domestically and $90,000 foreign.

Cast
 Rin Tin Tin as Rinty, a dog
 Matty Kemp as Bill Holmes
 Evelyn Pierce as Mary French
 Philo McCullough as Joe French
 Tom Dugan as Ed Mack
 Allan Cavan as Chief
 Grover Ligon as Scar

References

External links
 
 

1929 films
1929 crime films
American crime films
American silent feature films
1920s English-language films
American black-and-white films
Films directed by D. Ross Lederman
Rin Tin Tin
Films with screenplays by Robert Lord (screenwriter)
Warner Bros. films
1920s American films